Watan Kay Rakhwalay is 1991 Pakistani Double version Action film, Political film directed by Hasnain and produced by Mohammad Younis. The film stars actors Nadeem, Nadira, Sultan Rahi and Humayun Qureshi. It was edited by Mohammad Ashiq Ali, Hujra Shah Muqeem

Cast

Crew
Writer - Pervaiz Kaleem,
Producer - Mohammed Younis,
Production Company - Dost Movies
Cinematographer - Babar Bilal,
Music Director - Nazir Ali
Lyricist - Habib Jalib
Playback Singer - Humaira Channa

References

External links

 Watan Ke Rakhwaley
 WATAN KE RAKHWALLE (1991)

Pakistani political films
Pakistani action films
Pakistani fantasy films
1991 films
1990s Punjabi-language films
1990s Urdu-language films
Nigar Award winners
Political action films
1991 directorial debut films
Pakistani multilingual films